Theater Bremen (Bremen Theatre) is a state theatre in Bremen, Germany, with four divisions for opera, straight theater, dance, and student programs. Its venues are located in a city block, connected in architecture and seating up to 1,426 spectators. The theatre has drawn international attention since 1962 with innovative play productions in the Bremer Stil (Bremen style). Its opera company was selected as opera house of the year by Opernwelt in 2007.

Organization 
Theater Bremen is a company with four divisions: the Oper Bremen (Bremen 
opera), the Schauspiel Bremen (Bremen Playhouse), the Tanztheater Bremen (Bremen Dance Theatre) and the MoKS Bremen, short for Modellversuch Künstler und Schüler (Experimental Modal: Artists and Schoolgoers). The four venues seat up to 1,426 spectators. The musical divisions have collaborated since 1917 with the Bremer Philharmoniker, an orchestra founded in 1820. The theatre has drawn international attention since 1962, when Kurt Hübner staged innovative productions known as the Bremer Stil (Bremen style). Several stage directors and actors shaped the period, and many became well known, such as directors Peter Stein, Peter Zadek, Rainer Werner Fassbinder, Hans Neuenfels and Johannes Schaaf, and actors Edith Clever, Jutta Lampe, Margit Carstensen, Bruno Ganz, and Rolf Becker.

Location and venues 

 The theatre buildings are located in one city block and connected in architecture. They are known as the Theater am Goetheplatz, Kleines Haus, Moks and Brauhauskeller.

The Theater am Goetheplatz was opened in 1913 as a playhouse with a play by Oscar Wilde. It was destroyed in World War II and restored as a theatre for opera and plays. Reopened in 1950, it seats 800 people.

The Kleines Haus was remodelled in the 2012/13 season, seating up to 200 people, and presents plays and dance theatre. The foyer has a stage called "noon" for chamber concerts, lectures and other events.

Moks is a theatre for children and youth, offering performances for school classes in the morning and young people and their families in the evening. All spectators are close to the stage. The quality of productions has been regarded as high, receiving more than regional attention. Several plays were presented at a theatre competition.

The Brauhauskeller is located in the basement vaults of the former St. Pauli brewery. A small stage is intended for events for up to 60 spectators. It is the venue for the group Junge Akteure (young actors), which was founded in 2005, based on the Moks, as the theatre school of Theater Bremen. The stage is narrow and long, requiring unconventional sets. The theatre has around 400 employees.

Awards 
In 1979, Theater Bremen was named  (theatre of the year) by Theater heute. In 2007, the Theater Bremen was named Opernhaus des Jahres (Opera House of the Year) by Opernwelt, along with the Komische Oper Berlin. The Europäischer Toleranzpreis (European tolerance prize) of the KulturForum Europa was given for 's opera  in 2009.

Literature 
 Hermann Tardel (ed.): Studien zur Bremischen Theatergeschichte. Oldenburg 1945
 Franz Reichert: Durch meine Brille. Österreichischer Bundesverlag, Vienna 1986, 
 Michael Mrukwa: Das Bremer Staatstheater und das Bremer Schauspielhaus von 1933-45. Master's thesis, Bremen 1987
 Bremer Theater der Freien Hansestadt Bremen GmbH, Senator für Kultur und Ausländerintegration der Freien Hansestadt Bremen (ed.): 200 Jahre Theater in Bremen. WMIT-Druck-u. Verlags GmbH, Bremen 1993, 
 Herbert Schwarzwälder: Das Große Bremen-Lexikon, Bremen 2003, 
 Lutz-Uwe Dünnwald (ed.): Theater am Goetheplatz. Sanierung 2003–2004. Isensee GmbH, Oldenburg 2005
 Frank Schümann: Bremer Theater 1913–2007. Schünemann Verlag, Bremen 2007, 
 Klaus Pierwoß, Helmut Brade, Frank Schümann: Bremer Theater: Intendanz Klaus Pierwoß 1994/95–2006/07, Schünemann Verlag, Bremen 2007,

References

External links 

 
 
 Theater Bremen MIZ
 Förderung für Philharmoniker und Theater Bremen beschlossen butenunbinnen.de 19 December 2017
 Tanztheaterkooperation nordwest
 Auszeichnung theaterderzeit.de
 Ausstellung über einstigen Bremer Intendanten Kurt Hübner eröffnet Kreiszeitung
 Andreas Schnell: Die Erfindung des (West)Theaters nachtkritik.de 31 May 2013
 Matthias Heine: Wie Zadek, Stein & Grüber das Regietheater erfanden Die Welt 15 June 2008
 Theater Bremen (reviews, in German) nachtkritik.de
 

Culture in Bremen (city)
Theatres in Germany
Buildings and structures in Bremen (city)